Peleg Tallman (July 24, 1764 – March 12, 1840) was a United States representative from Massachusetts.  He was born in Tiverton in the Rhode Island Colony and attended public schools.  He served in the Revolutionary War on the privateer Trumbull, and lost an arm in an engagement in 1780. He was captured and imprisoned by the British.  After the War, he engaged in mercantile pursuits in Bath (which was a part of Massachusetts' District of Maine until 1820).

He was elected as a Democratic-Republican to the Twelfth Congress (March 4, 1811 – March 3, 1813).  He declined to be a candidate for renomination, and became an overseer of Bowdoin College 1802-1840.  Tallman served as a member of the Maine State Senate, and died in Bath.  His interment was in Maple Grove Cemetery, and was reinterred in Forest Hills Cemetery, Roxbury, Massachusetts.

References

External links

 Tallman Family Papers relating to the Tallman family including Peleg Tallman (1764–1840), Peleg Tallman (1836–1863), Frank G.Tallman (1860–1938) and Annie Dickie Tallman at Hagley Museum and Library

1764 births
1840 deaths
Members of the United States House of Representatives from Massachusetts
People from Tiverton, Rhode Island
Massachusetts Democratic-Republicans
Maine Democratic-Republicans
Maine state senators
People from Bath, Maine
Democratic-Republican Party members of the United States House of Representatives from the District of Maine